Nechamandra is a monotypic genus of an aquatic plant family Hydrocharitaceae. The sole species is Nechamandra alternifolia.  It is found in slow moving fresh water.

Distribution and habitat
This is a rare plant in lakes and ponds. It is known from Asian fresh waters of Sudan, Socotra, Sri Lanka, India, Nepal, Bangladesh, China, Myanmar, Thailand, and Vietnam.

Chromosome number
Chromosome numbers of 2n = 14 is reported from India and Myanmar.

References

External links

Flora of Asia
Hydrocharitaceae genera
Monotypic Alismatales genera
Hydrocharitaceae